Kansas's 22nd Senate district is one of 40 districts in the Kansas Senate. It has been represented by Democrat Tom Hawk since 2013, succeeding Republican Roger Reitz.

Geography
District 22 is based in Manhattan, covering all of Clay and Riley Counties as well as a small part of northern Geary County. Other communities in the district include Clay Center, Ogden, Wakefield, Riley, and parts of western Junction City.

The district is located entirely within Kansas's 1st congressional district, and overlaps with the 51st, 64th, 65th, 66th, 67th, 68th, and 70th districts of the Kansas House of Representatives.

Recent election results

2020

2016

2012

Federal and statewide results in District 22

References

22
Clay County, Kansas
Geary County, Kansas
Riley County, Kansas